Dharam Narayan Singh (25 December 1936 – 27 July 2017) was an Indian senior congress politician who served as the 11th Chief Minister of Karnataka from 
28 May 2004 to 28 January 2006 and Member of the Lok Sabha from Bidar Lok Sabha constituency, in 15th Lok Sabha from 2009 to 2014. He was the 18th President of the Karnataka Pradesh Congress Committee and  he was the nine-term Member of the Karnataka Legislative Assembly from Jevaragi constituency.

Early life and family
Dharam Singh was born in Nelogi village of Jevargi taluk (in Kalaburagi district of the Karnataka). He was from a Rajput family, who are minority community in Karnataka. He obtained his master's and law degrees from Osmania University, Hyderabad.

Political career
Singh began his career in politics as an Independent Corporator in the Kalaburagi district City Municipal Council by contesting against his own brother. He started his political career as a socialist. He was brought up under the influence of Bhim Sena founder B. Shyam Sunder who was a  legislator to Hyderabad State and served as its Deputy speaker. He was the Secretary of Hyderabad Karnataka Youth League, and his election agent in 1957, and issued a pamphlet in Urdu to vote in his favour.

In the late 1960s, he joined the Indian National Congress and his loyalty made him a strong contender for the post of Chief Minister in 2004.

He gave up the Kalaburgi Lok Sabha seat of which he was the Member of Parliament to accommodate C.M. Stephen, who was a Union Minister in the Indira Gandhi Cabinet, in 1980 on Indira Gandhi's directions.

He has served as a minister under various chief ministers such as Devaraj Urs, R. Gundu Rao, S. Bangarappa, M. Veerappa Moily and S. M. Krishna, and has handled diverse portfolios such as Home, Excise, Social Welfare, Urban Development and Revenue. He was KPCC president in the 1990s when his party was out of power. At that time, the Congress' national leadership was headed by Sitaram Kesri, of whom Singh was said to be a favourite. He lost out to his senior colleague S. M. Krishna in the race to the Chief Minister's post in 1999. Then, he joined the Krishna ministry and handled the Public Works Department portfolio.

When the 2004 state elections resulted in a hung assembly with no party getting enough seats to form a government, the Congress and Janata Dal (Secular) (JD(S)) parties decided to come together and form a coalition government. Known for his adaptability and friendly nature and his close political ties with H. D. Deve Gowda, Dharam Singh was the unanimous choice of both parties to head the government. He was sworn in as Chief Minister on 28 May 2004. He was the second leader from Kalaburgi to become Chief Minister after Veerendra Patil. For almost 20 months, he led the fragile coalition through many ups and downs.

He was criticised for not being assertive in the sense of coming from minority community and further allowing the JD(S) supremo to join hands, which was their junior partner in coalition to call the shots in the government. He left office on 3 February 2006 after the collapse of the Coalition government formed by the Congress (I) due to a defection in the JD(S) engineered by H.D. Kumaraswamy, who succeeded him as Chief Minister, leading a new coalition with the BJP.

During the tenure of H.D. Kumaraswamy, Dharam Singh was the Leader of Opposition in the Karnataka Legislative Assembly. However, in the 2008 state elections he was defeated by a political lightweight, Doddappagouda Patil Naribol of the BJP, by a slim margin of 52 postal votes. In the Lok Sabha elections held in May 2009, he contested the Bidar Lok Sabha constituency and emerged victorious against his former colleague Gurupadappa Nagmarpalli of the BJP by a huge margin of 92,222 votes. However, Dharam Singh had to bite dust in 2014 Lok Sabha election when he lost to Bhagwant Khuba by over a lakh votes, which ended his political career.

Death

He died on 27 July 2017 due to cardiac arrest in Bengaluru, aged 80. He was cremated with State Honours and by Rajput Tradition.

Positions held
 1967: Councillor, Gulbarga City Municipal Council
 1972–2008: Member of Karnataka Legislative Assembly
 Member of State Backward Classes Commission
 Minister for Urban Development, Karnataka
 Minister for Home & Excise, Karnataka
 Minister for Revenue and Social Welfare 
 KPCC President
 1999-2004: Minister for Public works, Karnataka
 also PWD minister of Karnataka state
 2004-2006: Chief Minister of Karnataka
 2006-2007: Leader of Opposition, Karnataka Legislative Assembly
 2009-2014: Member Of Parliament

Criticism and controversy
The Karnataka Lokayukta Justice Nitte Santosh Hegde in 2008 has found Dharam Singh and 11 other officials guilty of causing a loss to the State exchequer owing to irregularities in the mining sector. The Lokayukta report indicted him for causing a loss of Rs. 23.22 crore. According to the report, Dharam Singh is at fault for allowing illegal mining in "patta" lands. The Lokayukta had also asked for the amount caused as loss to be recovered from Dharam Singh.

References

External links
 Karnataka CM's Profile
 Dharam Singh Watch

|-

1936 births
2017 deaths
Chief Ministers of Karnataka
People from Bidar district
People from Kalaburagi district
India MPs 1980–1984
India MPs 2009–2014
Lok Sabha members from Karnataka
Leaders of the Opposition in the Karnataka Legislative Assembly
Chief ministers from Indian National Congress
Indian National Congress politicians from Karnataka
Mysore MLAs 1972–1977
Members of the Mysore Legislature
Karnataka MLAs 1978–1983
Karnataka MLAs 1983–1985
Karnataka MLAs 1985–1989
Karnataka MLAs 1989–1994
Karnataka MLAs 1994–1999
Karnataka MLAs 1999–2004
Karnataka MLAs 2004–2007